The 1961 WCHA Men's Ice Hockey Tournament was the 2nd conference playoff in league history. The tournament was played between March 10 and March 11, 1961. All games were played at home team campus sites. By being declared as co-champions, both Minnesota and Denver were invited to participate in the 1961 NCAA Men's Ice Hockey Tournament.

Though not official designations, Minnesota is considered as the East Regional Champion† and Denver as the West Regional Champion‡.

Format
The top four teams in the WCHA, based upon the conference regular season standings, were eligible for the tournament and were seeded No. 1 through No. 4. In the first round the first and fourth seeds and the second and third seeds were matched in two-game series where the team with the higher number of goals scored was declared the winner. Rather than decide upon a single tournament champion, the WCHA declared the winners of the two series as co-tournament champions.

Conference standings
Note: GP = Games played; W = Wins; L = Losses; T = Ties; PCT = Winning percentage; GF = Goals for; GA = Goals against

Bracket

Note: * denotes overtime period(s)

Finals

(1) Denver vs. (4) Michigan Tech

(2) Minnesota vs. (3) Michigan

Tournament awards
None

See also
Western Collegiate Hockey Association men's champions
1961 NCAA Division I Men's Ice Hockey Tournament

References

External links
WCHA.com
1960–61 WCHA Standings
1960–61 NCAA Standings
2013–14 Denver Pioneers Media Guide
2013–14 Michigan Wolverines Media Guide; Through the Years
2013–14 Minnesota Golden Gophers Media Guide 

WCHA Men's Ice Hockey Tournament
WCHA Men's Ice Hockey Tournament